Landover is an island-platformed Washington Metro station in Landover, Maryland, United States. The station was opened on November 20, 1978, and is operated by the Washington Metropolitan Area Transit Authority (WMATA). Providing service for the Orange Line, the station is in a residential area of Landover at Pennsy Drive near Landover Road. It is primarily a commuter station, with parking for over 1,800 cars, but it also served the now-demolished Capital Centre, the former home of the Washington Bullets and Washington Capitals.

History
The station opened on November 20, 1978.

The Pennsylvania Railroad (later Penn Central, then Conrail) previously operated a commuter rail stop at Landover, located at Old Landover Road. In August 1982, when Conrail trains began stopping at Capital Beltway station, used by intercity trains since 1970, Lanham and Landover stations were closed.

In May 2018, Metro announced an extensive renovation of platforms at twenty stations across the system. New Carrollton station was closed from May 28, 2022, through September 5, 2022, as part of the summer platform improvement project, which also affected the Minnesota Avenue, Deanwood, Cheverly, and Landover stations on the Orange Line. Shuttle buses and free parking were provided at the closed stations.

Station layout

References

External links
 

 The Schumin Web Transit Center: Landover Station

Stations on the Orange Line (Washington Metro)
Washington Metro stations in Maryland
Railway stations in the United States opened in 1978
Railway stations in Prince George's County, Maryland
1978 establishments in Maryland